National Lampoon Songbook was an American humorous songbook which was issued in 1976. Although it appears to be a book in its own right, it was a "special issue" of National Lampoon magazine and as such it was only sold on newsstands. People who had a subscription to the magazine would still have to buy these special issues; they were not included in the subscription.

Many of the songs in the songbook were from the musical stage show, Lemmings. A few other songs, including the whole musical "Moby!" were from The National Lampoon Radio Hour. Other songs were from the album Goodbye Pop. There were also some visual print pieces (illustrations and photographs) included. The first piece in the songbook is Deteriorata, which was on the album Radio Dinner. The musical arrangements were by Dan Fox.

The songbook was edited by Sean Kelly. The cover illustrations was a drawing showing a number of musicians on stage and a row of the audience. The drawing was a group effort by cartoonists Randall Enos, Gahan Wilson, Bobby London, Jeff Jones, Shary Flenniken and Charles Rodrigues. The songbook was designed by the design studio Pellegrini, Kaestle & Gross, Inc.

Songs
 Deteriorata, a parody of Desiderata
 Lemmings Lament, a parody of Woodstock (song)
 Pizza Man, a parody of 1950s death songs such as Leader of the Pack
 Nirvana Banana, a parody of Donovan
 Colorado, A Parody of John Denver
 Positively Wall Street, a parody of Bob Dylan
 Pull the Tregroes, a parody of Joan Baez
 Papa was a Running-Dog Lackey of the Bourgeoisie, a parody of Motown music
 Highway Toes, a parody of James Taylor
 Lonely at the Bottom, a parody of Joe Cocker and Leon Russell
 Megadeath, a parody of heavy metal (music)
 Overdose Heaven
 Well-Intentioned Blues, a parody of Pete Seeger
 Closet Queen, a parody of a lounge singer
 The Ballad of K. C. River Rat, a parody of a trucker song
 Saint Leonard's Song, a parody of Leonard Cohen
 Mother Goose's Wine
 Riding Out on a Rail,  parody of the Grateful Dead
 Bleeding Heart, A parody of Cat Stevens
 Psychology Ptoday Blues (Every Day I Feel Depressed), Chicago blues style
 Methadone Maintenance Man, A parody of James Taylor
 Goodbye Pop, a parody of Elton John
 Kung Fu Christmas, A parody of disco ballad style
 The B Side of Love, a parody of country music
 I'm a Woman, a parody of I am Woman
 Old Maid (Southern California Brings Me Down),  a parody of Neil Young
 Art Rock Suite, a parody of mid-70s Art rock
 Down to Jamaica, a reggae and Bob Dylan parody
 Moby!, the novel Moby Dick as musical theatre
 All Ashore
 Call Me Ishmael
 Seaman's Lexicon
 The Unhappiest Man at Sea
 The Present
 You're Never Too Old to Love
 All Hands on Me
 Moby
 You're Never Too Old to Love (reprise)

References

 Contents list and more info at Mark's Very Large National Lampoon Site
 Amazon listing

Songbook
1976 books
Song books